German Regional Airlines GmbH & Co. KG, operating under the German Airways brand and formerly named WDL Aviation, is a German charter and wet lease aircraft operator, headquartered at Cologne Bonn Airport, and part of the Zeitfracht Group.

History

Initially named WDL Flugdienst, the company was set up in 1974 as a subsidiary of Westdeutsche Luftwerbung GmbH, an aerial advertising provider founded in 1955.

The current name was adopted in 1991, when the parent was reorganized as WDL Group. With WDL Aviation offering aircraft lease and charter services, the aerial advertising and sightseeing flight branch (using blimps) survives in the other subsidiary of WDL Group, which is called WDL Luftschiff. Since 1998, the British Aerospace 146 is in service with WDL Aviation. Other aircraft types that were operated by WDL Aviation include the Fokker F27 Friendship and an Airbus A320-200 on lease from Adria Airways between 1992 and 1993.

WDL Aviation was acquired by the Berlin logistics company Zeitfracht on 1 October 2017. During 2018, WDL Aviation started acquiring BAe 146-300 QT freighter aircraft while planning to replace its BAe 146 passenger aircraft with newer Embraer 190s and received its new brand name German Airways thereafter.

In March 2020, Zeitfracht announced a rebranding for WDL Aviation which is to become German Regional Airlines operating within the German Airways branding alongside sister company Luftfahrtgesellschaft Walter which became the actual, and now defunct, German Airways.

Corporate affairs

Ownership and structure
German Regional Airlines is owned by Zeitfracht Group, an owner-managed family business with interests in logistics, aviation and real estate. It has its headquarters in Berlin and over 1,200 employees. German Airways is part of Zeitfracht Aviation, together with the now defunct German Airways Fluggesellschaft mbH, which ran short-lived wet lease operations for Eurowings.

Business trends
Both German Regional Airlines and the Zeitfracht Group are private companies, and annual reports do not appear to be published. In the absence of these, the little information for German Regional Airlines that appears to be available is:

Fleet
As of August 2022, the German Regional Airlines fleet consists of the following aircraft:

Incidents
 On 25 March 2019, British Airways Flight 3271 operated by then WDL Aviation, which took off from London City Airport enroute to Düsseldorf but landed in Edinburgh. BA blamed WDL Aviation for a paperwork error.

References

External links

 Official website

Airlines of Germany
Airlines established in 1974
1974 establishments in West Germany
Companies based in North Rhine-Westphalia
Companies based in Cologne
German companies established in 1974